IWF Promotions was an independent professional wrestling company based in Denver, Colorado that was founded in 2001 by Tamera Halbeisen.  IWF was the only known wrestling company in the United States that was owned by a Hispanic Woman. Showcasing two styles of professional wrestling including American professional wrestling and the Mexican style; Lucha Libre with over 25 high-impact live events yearly in the Denver, Colorado metropolitan area.

History

IWF Promotions was started July 14, 2001 by Tamera Halbeisen, Larry Shelton and Alan Carnill. Hosting shows with a Rock and Wrestling theme, booking local bands and independent professional wrestling at events held at the Gothic Theater in Denver, Colorado. Continuing to cross promote independent wrestling IWF joined with Knockout Events, a regional Toughman organization throughout 2002 and 2003 and then again in 2005.

Beginning in 2003 a series of semi-monthly events were held at the Sheridan Recreation Center, Sheridan, Colorado. Professional wrestlers involved in these events included The Honky Tonk Man, Superfly Jimmy Snuka, Beautiful Bobby Dean, Kato, Beetlejuice (Alan Carnill), breaking ground for many independent wrestlers such as Prodigee & Shocktherapy.

January 25, 2004 Co-Founder Alan Carnill was killed after he was thrown from a car in which he was a passenger. The car went out of control on an icy bridge before flipping over outside Hays, Kansas on his way back home to Colorado after working a wrestling show the night before in Hoisington, Kansas. The other passengers in the car include Larry Shelton, Carrie Mathews, Joseph McDougal and Gerald Krueger.

IWF continued to run semi-monthly events in the Denver, Colorado metropolitan area, as well in the rocky mountain region including Gillette, Wyoming, Pueblo and Fairplay, Colorado until closing in January 2005.

After a year and a half hiatus IWF resumed operations as IWF Premier Pro Wrestling by booking monthly wrestling shows and opened The Butcher Shop, a professional wrestling training gym located in Commerce City, Colorado. IWF Promotions currently runs monthly wrestling shows under IWF Premier, IWF Lucha Libre & Primos Hardcore & Wrestling throughout the metro Denver, Colorado area.

In August 2011 IWF Promotions was sold to Joseph McDougal and he continues to run it exclusively under the Primos Hardcore & Wrestling name, Joseph also runs and has maintained the Butcher Shop Pro Wrestling Gym in the Denver metro area.

The Butcher Shop

The Butcher Shop trains both American or Sports Entertainment and Lucha Libre style wrestlers. Guest trainers have included Dennis Condrey, Jerry Lynn, Big Van Vader (Leon White), Mad Man Pondo (Kevin Canady), and Colt Cabana (Scott Colton).

Publicity

In 2008 the Butcher Shop was featured by the Westword Newspaper.

The Greeley Tribune featured High Flying Wrestling action at the Fiesta

IWF was featured in the Independent film Faces and Heels: A Real Look at Independent Wrestling by Daniel R. Beehler.

Roster

Champions

Friends of IWF 
 Jerry Lynn
 Big Van Vader (Leon White)
 Dennis Condrey
 Mad Man Pondo (Kevin Canady)
 Scot Summers
 Corporal Robinson (Steve Robinson)
 Tiki Tapu
 Violent J (Joseph Frank "Joe" Bruce)
 Bobby Lashley
 Hijo de Rey Misterio
 The Universal Heartthrob Don Juan
 Colt Cabana (Scott Colton)

See also
List of independent wrestling promotions in the United States

References

External links
 The Official IWF Premier Pro Wrestling on Myspace
 The Official IWF Premier Pro Wrestling on Twitter
 The Official IWF Premier Pro Wrestling YouTube Channel

Independent professional wrestling promotions based in the Southwestern United States
Professional wrestling schools
Companies based in Denver
Sports in Denver
Sports organizations established in 2001